WGGY (101.3 FM, "Froggy 101") is a commercial radio station licensed to serve Scranton, Pennsylvania. The station is owned by Audacy, Inc. and broadcasts a country music format.

WGGY uses HD Radio, and broadcasts an AAA format on its HD2 subchannel.

Froggy 101 received national attention through NBC's series, The Office, with a Froggy 101 bumper sticker displayed on a filing cabinet beside Dwight Schrute's desk.

Simulcasts and repeaters
WGGY's programming is simulcast on booster stations WGGY-FM1, WGGY-FM2 and WGGY-FM3. Until November 16, 2017, the programming was also simulcast on full-power WGGI (95.9 FM).

On September 26, 2017, Entercom (forerunner of Audacy) announced a divestment of three stations (KSOQ-FM, WGGI, and KSWD) to the Educational Media Foundation (EMF) as part of its merger with CBS Radio to comply with FCC ownership rules in the Wilkes Barre market; the FCC approved the sale of all three stations on November 2. The announcement stated that upon the closing of the acquisition, EMF would flip WGGI to its K-Love network which airs contemporary Christian music; parent station WGGY would remain unchanged. EMF changed WGGI's call sign to WKBP on November 16.

References

External links
 

GGY
Radio stations established in 1948
Audacy, Inc. radio stations
Country radio stations in the United States